The canton of Chaumont-en-Vexin is an administrative division of the Oise department, northern France. Its borders were modified at the French canton reorganisation which came into effect in March 2015. Its seat is in Chaumont-en-Vexin.

It consists of the following communes:
 
Abbecourt
Berthecourt
Boubiers
Bouconvillers
Boury-en-Vexin
Boutencourt
Cauvigny
Chambors
Chaumont-en-Vexin
Chavençon
Corbeil-Cerf
La Corne-en-Vexin
Le Coudray-sur-Thelle
Courcelles-lès-Gisors
Delincourt
La Drenne
Énencourt-Léage
Éragny-sur-Epte
Fay-les-Étangs
Fleury
Fresne-Léguillon
Hadancourt-le-Haut-Clocher
Les Hauts Talican
Hénonville
Hodenc-l'Évêque
Ivry-le-Temple
Jaméricourt
Jouy-sous-Thelle
Laboissière-en-Thelle
Lachapelle-Saint-Pierre
Lattainville
Lavilletertre
Liancourt-Saint-Pierre
Lierville
Loconville
Le Mesnil-Théribus
Monneville
Montagny-en-Vexin
Montchevreuil
Montjavoult
Montreuil-sur-Thérain
Monts
Mortefontaine-en-Thelle
Mouchy-le-Châtel
Neuville-Bosc
Noailles
Novillers
Parnes
Ponchon
Pouilly
Reilly
Saint-Crépin-Ibouvillers
Saint-Sulpice
Sainte-Geneviève
Senots
Serans
Silly-Tillard
Thibivillers
Tourly
Trie-Château
Trie-la-Ville
Valdampierre
Vaudancourt
Villers-Saint-Sépulcre

References

Cantons of Oise